Morven is a rural town and locality in the Shire of Murweh, Queensland, Australia.

Geography 

Morven Aerodrome has an unsealed runway of red loam, . It is operated by Murweh Shire Council.

History
Originally, the area on which Morven now sits was a popular spot for bullock teams on the road between Mitchell and Charleville. In 1859, a small area was taken from the property Victoria Downs and set aside for public use and designated on maps and documents as 'Victoria Downs Reserve'. It was on the Cobb & Co mail route from Brisbane to Charleville. Later it became informally known as 'Sadlier's Waterhole' after Captain TJ Sadlier and his wife camped at the property.

In 1876, a post office was opened and called Morven. When officially surveyed in 1880, it was officially given the name Morven. It is believed to be named after Morven in Aberdeenshire, Scotland.

Morven State School opened on 24 September 1887.

All Souls Anglican Church opened in 1906 and was dedicated in 1926.

On Sunday 14 March 1926, Archbishop James Duhig opened and consecrated the Sacred Heart Roman Catholic church.

On Tuesday 26 April 2016, the Morven Hotel Motel was burned down. It was a big loss to the town as it was the only hotel in the town. It was rebuilt by members of the local community in 2020 and now trades as Sadleir's Waterhole after the original name for the community.

Heritage listings
Morven has a number of heritage-listed sites, including:
  west of Morven on the Roma-Cunnamulla railway line: Angellala Rail Bridge

Education 
Morven State School is a government primary (Prep-6) school for boys and girls at Albert Street. In 2017, the school had an enrolment of 23 students with 3 teachers (2 full-time equivalent) and 5 non-teaching staff (2 full-time equivalent). In 2018, the school had an enrolment of 20 students with 3 teachers (2 full-time equivalent) and 5 non-teaching staff (2 full-time equivalent).

There is no secondary school in Morven. School Bus Route S280 conveys students from Year 7 to Year 12 to Charleville State High School in Charleville to the west.

Transport 
Morven is ideally situated at the junction of the Warrego Highway to Charleville and the Landsborough Highway to Augathella. this, coupled with the strategic position on which Morven is situated makes it an ideal launching point for travelers heading up to the Stockman's Hall of Fame or Trucks headed for Darwin.

Morven is a timetabled stop for the Intercity Bus Services operated by Greyhound Australia:

 Gx493 Brisbane to Mount Isa
 Gx494 Mount Isa to Brisbane
 Gx495 Brisbane to Charleville
 Gx496 Charleville to Brisbane

Morven Railway Station serves the town and people of Morven. it is used by the twice-weekly Westlander passenger train.

 The Westbound service (3S86) from Brisbane Roma Street to Charleville stops at Morven Wednesdays and Fridays at 9:55 am.
 The Eastbound service (3987) from Charleville to Brisbane Roma Street stops at Morven Wednesdays and Fridays at 7:55 pm.

Facilities
Morven has a historical museum and heritage trail. Nearby is the Tregole National Park (where the Mulga Lands and the Brigalow Belt meet)

The Murweh Shire Council operates a public library in Morven on the Warrego Highway.

The Morven branch of the Queensland Country Women's Association has its rooms in Roma Street.

All Souls Anglican Church is in Eurella Street and holds services on the 3rd Sunday of every month.

Sacred Heart Catholic Church is in Eurella Street. No regular services are held at this church.

The Sadlier's Waterhole Hotel is on the Warrego Highway on the site of the Morven Hotel/Motel (which was destroyed by fire in 2016).

Other facilities include:

 Morven Police Station
 Morven Fire Station
 Morven SES Facility
 Morven Community Health Clinic
 Morven Ambulance Station
 Morven Cemetery

Attractions 
Morven Historical Museum is at 53 Albert Street.

Media 
the Australian Broadcasting Corporation and its sister channels ABC Kids/ABC TV Plus, ABC ME and ABC News transmits to Morven through its relay station, ABMNQ, situated at 26°30′20″S 147°8′4″E (Morven - Nebine Road) and it also transmits ABC Radio National to Morven on 107.5 FM.

Radio 4VL (part of the Resonate Radio Network) transmits to Morven on 105.9 FM.

The Seven Network and its sister channels, 7Two and 7Mate transmit to Morven through its regional area affiliate, ITQ.

The Nine Network and its sister channels 9Gem and 9Go! transmit to Morven through its regional area affiliate, Imparja.

Network Ten and its sister channels 10 Bold and 10 Peach transmit to Morven through its regional area affiliate, CDT.

The Special Broadcasting Service and its sister channels SBS Viceland, SBS World Movies and SBS Food also transmit to Morven.

References

Further reading

External links

 

Towns in Queensland
South West Queensland
Shire of Murweh
Localities in Queensland